Sherman Township is an inactive township in Cass County, in the U.S. state of Missouri.

Sherman Township was established in 1872, taking its name from William Tecumseh Sherman, a general in the American Civil War.

References

Townships in Missouri
Townships in Cass County, Missouri